Eriophyes padi is a gall-forming mite that causes cherry pouch galls on black cherry trees. Eriophyes padi belongs to the genus Eriophyes and the family Eriophyidae. It lives in Europe and Russia

References

Agricultural pest mites
Eriophyidae
Animals described in 1890
Arachnids of North America